Robert S. Lewis, Jr. (October 6, 1925 – April 11, 2012) was an American college basketball player notable as a starting forward on the University of Utah's 1944 National Championship team.

Lewis was born and grew up in Salt Lake City, the son of a University of Utah professor.  He and his twin brother Fred attended East High School and came to their father's university to play basketball for coach Vadal Peterson in the Fall of 1943.  Due to the shortage of college-aged men associated with World War II, freshmen were eligible to play varsity basketball (freshmen wouldn't become permanently eligible until 1973).  Known as the "Blitz Kids," Lewis joined classmates Arnie Ferrin, Dick Smuin and Herb Wilkinson to become the first champions in NCAA men's basketball history to feature four freshmen in the starting lineup.

Following the championship season, the Lewis twins joined the Army for World War II.  After their stint in the military, both Lewises moved to Stanford University to finish their academic careers.  Bob Lewis played basketball for Stanford coach Everett Dean and played three years for the Indians.  Lewis was noted as a strong defensive player during his time in Palo Alto.  In addition to basketball, Lewis was a standout tennis player at Stanford.

Lewis graduated with an engineering degree and went into a career in the aerospace industry.

Bob Lewis died on April 11, 2012 at his home in Tucson, Arizona.

References

1925 births
2012 deaths
United States Army personnel of World War II
Basketball players from Salt Lake City
American men's basketball players
Forwards (basketball)
Identical twins
Stanford Cardinal men's basketball players
Stanford Cardinal men's tennis players
American twins
Twin sportspeople
Utah Utes men's basketball players